Susan Scott may refer to:

 Susan Holloway Scott, American author, also known as Miranda Jarrett
 Nieves Navarro (born 1938), Spanish-born Italian actress, stage name Susan Scott
 Susan Scott (runner) (born 1977), British middle distance runner
 Susan Beth Scott, American Paralympic swimmer
 Susan G. Scott (born 1949), Canadian artist
 Susan M. Scott, Australian physicist
 Susan Scott (born 1944), author of Fierce Conversations: Achieving Success at Work and in Life One Conversation at a Time

See also 
 Sue Scott (disambiguation)